Budziszyn may refer to:
Bautzen, Germany - Budziszyn in Polish
Budziszyn, Masovian Voivodeship (east-central Poland)